Morocco competed at the 2012 Summer Paralympics in London, United Kingdom, from 29 August to 9 September 2012.

Background 
Sarsah Jolol was quoted by the BBC as saying of the 2012 Paralympics, "There is a stigma in the Arab world when discussing the plight of people with disability. In Morocco there is not the necessary infrastructure to support and accommodate the needs of people with disabilities. On the other hand in Europe, the disabled enjoy a life without discrimination with the forthcoming Paralympic Games being proof."

Medalists
The following Moroccan competitors won medals at the Games.

Athletics
Abdelillah Mame won a bronze medal for Morocco in the Men's 800m T13 event on September 6.

Powerlifting

Women

Volleyball

Men's tournament
Roster

Group play

9th–10th place classification

Wheelchair tennis

References

Nations at the 2012 Summer Paralympics
2012
2012 in Moroccan sport